Ralph James "Bucky" Phillips (born June 19, 1962) is a convicted murderer from Western New York caught on September 8, 2006, by the Pennsylvania State Police.  A warrant was issued for his arrest following the shooting of three New York State troopers, one of whom died from their wounds.

On September 7, 2006, he became the 483rd fugitive listed by the FBI on the Ten Most Wanted list. Prior to his capture, Phillips attained the distinction of being one of the few fugitives ever to be simultaneously on the FBI Ten Most Wanted Fugitives list and U.S. Marshal Service's Top 15 list. He replaced Warren Jeffs on the FBI's list and was apprehended the day after he was added.

Early life
Phillips was raised in Stockton, New York. He spent much of his life on the run, starting as a child by running away from his abusive father.

Prior criminal history
Phillips has an expansive history in the New York State correctional system prior to his April 2006 escape from the Erie County Correctional Facility in Alden, New York. He had previously been convicted on three counts of burglary in the third degree, two counts of grand larceny in the fourth degree, and other various crimes.

During a transfer out of Chautauqua County Jail, he left a note threatening "to splatter pig meat all over Chautauqua County", with the term "pig" being derogatory slang for a police officer.

At the time of his escape, he was serving a 90-day sentence for violating the terms of his parole. He had been released in November 2005 after a burglary conviction, but failed to report to his parole officer, so he was again arrested on January 6.

There is some controversy about the events leading to the revocation of his parole. Family members claim that the ex-husband of Phillips' ex-girlfriend Kasey Crowe intentionally misinformed Phillips' parole officer in a ploy to return him to jail. It's believed that the ex-husband fabricated a story about being threatened by Phillips. People close to Phillips say that he was not a violent person and he was looking forward to rebuilding a relationship with his daughter and grandchildren.

Fugitive events
Phillips was being held in Erie County jail for a parole violation, but escaped on April 2, 2006, and was on the run until September 8, 2006. He escaped by cutting through the corrugated metal roof of the facility's kitchen using a can opener. He is believed to have stolen numerous vehicles and broken into several cabins across Western New York and Warren County, Pennsylvania and McKean County, Pennsylvania. Police believe that at some point, he walked on Oliver Road looking for people to pick him up.

During the earlier phases of the hunt, Phillips acquired somewhat of a folk hero status, with local businesses selling T-shirts saying "Where's Bucky?", "Run, Bucky, Run!", "Don't Shoot, Not Bucky", or "Got Bucky?" (a parody of Got Milk?), a local restaurant selling a "Bucky Burger" (because it was served in a 'to-go' box for those on the run), and a local folk musician, Noah Gokey, releasing a single entitled "Run Bucky Run!". With Phillips' local roots, it was suspected that numerous friends and relatives might have been giving him shelter.

First shooting
On June 10, 2006, around 1 a.m., State Trooper Sean Brown was shot in Veteran, New York (approximately 10 miles north of Elmira). Brown had seen a Ford Mustang which had been reported stolen, and as he approached the vehicle the driver, who was later identified as Phillips, shot at him and sped off. The officer was seriously injured with gunshot wounds to the abdomen. On June 27, after reports of stolen vehicles and break-ins, police in Chautauqua County, New York found an abandoned backpack which contained items tied to Phillips, as well as the .38 caliber handgun he had allegedly used in the June 10 incident.

On August 8, police were minutes behind Phillips after he was reported on the Tuscarora Indian Reservation in Niagara County, New York; however, he disappeared into the woods. On August 19, a policeman checking out a motorcycle with invalid tags spotted Phillips and chased him into an apartment complex. Once inside, the officer discovered a group of people believed to have been hiding Bucky for several days, who were subsequently arrested.  Phillips, however, escaped once more.

Second shooting
When Phillips learned that members of his family would be detained for questioning, he reportedly threatened police, warning them to stay away from his friends and family. During a stakeout of a related member's house on August 31 in the town of Pomfret in Chautauqua County, a second shooting took place. Police believe Phillips shot two New York State Troopers with a high-powered rifle: Donald Baker Jr., 38, and Joseph Longobardo, 32. Eleven shots were fired in total. Trooper Baker was struck in the right flank, with the bullet exiting the left flank, and was flown to Hamot Shock Trauma Center in Erie, Pennsylvania.  Trooper Longobardo was struck in the leg, severing an artery, and was flown to Erie County Medical Center in Buffalo. On Sunday, September 3, 2006, Trooper Longobardo died following an unsuccessful attempt to save his life through the amputation of his leg. On November 9, 2006, Baker was released from Hamot and transferred by NYSP helicopter to Albany Medical Center to continue his recovery. It was shortly after the second shooting that the reward for information leading to the arrest of Phillips topped $450,000. 

Kasey Crowe, Phillips' ex-girlfriend and mother of his daughter, was immediately sent back to jail due to her bail being revoked. She was later released when the witness did not show up at her hearing.

Captured
Phillips was captured by Pennsylvania State Police at around 8:00 pm (EDT) on Friday, September 8, 2006, in Warren County, Pennsylvania.  Phillips was captured, according to the AP, without gunfire.  Phillips, who was hiding in a lightly wooded area at the time of his capture, was spotted by a Warren County Sheriffs Deputy from a distance, who relayed the message to the troopers in the immediate area. As the police officers surrounded him, Phillips surrendered, with his hands raised.

Phillips was originally charged by the United States Marshals Service with "interstate flight to avoid prosecution." Federal authorities then waived their charges so New York State could proceed with attempted murder charges against Phillips as a result of the shooting of Trooper Sean Brown. Numerous other state and federal charges are pending. Murder and a second attempted murder charges could be filed if evidence is produced which ties Phillips to the shootings of Troopers Baker and Longobardo. 

It was announced on September 11 that New York State Police found a .308 rifle on September 10 in the woods where Phillips was believed to have spent time before his capture on September 8. Forensic tests were conducted on the weapon.

On November 29, 2006, Phillips pleaded guilty (or, in his own words, "guilty as hell") to charges of aggravated murder (for the shooting of Joseph Longobardo) and attempted aggravated murder (for the shooting of Donald Baker Jr. and Sean Brown). On December 19 he was sentenced in Chautauqua County Court to life without parole for shooting and killing Trooper Longobardo and 40 years to life for shooting and wounding Trooper Baker. On December 20 he was sentenced in Chemung County Court to 40 years to life for shooting and wounding Trooper Brown. He is serving his sentence at Upstate Correctional Facility in Malone, New York (Franklin County).

Timeline

April 2:
Ralph "Bucky" Phillips, who has spent 20 of the past 23 years in state prison, escapes from the Alden Correctional Facility in Erie County near Buffalo, cutting through the kitchen ceiling with a can opener.

April - June:
During this time, police suspect Phillips is related to several break-ins at hunting cabins in Erie, Allegany and Cattaraugus counties. A pickup truck stolen in Allegany County ends up in Ohio where another vehicle is stolen, and authorities suspect Phillips is involved. Phillips is allegedly spotted by residents in the areas around Sinclairville, Stockton, Randolph, and Great Valley, New York, as well as Bradford, Pennsylvania. Police speculate that Phillips' relatives are staging crimes to distract them and throw them off his trail. 

June 10:
State Trooper Sean Brown is shot in the abdomen during a traffic stop near Elmira in New York's Southern Tier. State police say they're looking for Phillips as a "person of interest".

June 15:
Police continue scouring the Elmira-Binghamton area, but set up checkpoints in Pomfret, New York as Phillips has significant ties to the area. 

June 20:
Phillips is believed to have stolen a Dodge Caravan in the town of Hancock, east of Binghamton. 

June 24:
The Dodge Caravan stolen in Hancock is found in the town of Sheridan, and police believe Phillips is on the loose in northern Chautauqua County. A red ATV was stolen in the same area which was the same make and model Brad Horton was riding on early on the 25th when he was stopped. 

June 25: 
Brad Horton dies after being shot five times in the back by New York State trooper Sean Pierce, when he attempts to flee a roadblock on an ATV. The trooper was allegedly being dragged by the ATV and fired the shots because he believed his life was endangered. The Trooper did not receive any serious injuries and was able to return to duty the same night. An investigation cleared Pierce of criminal liability. 

June 29:
Police drop a dragnet around Cassadaga, New York.

July: 
"Bucky Burgers" and T-shirts saying "Where's Bucky?" or "Got Bucky?" are offered for sale in Phillips' native Chautauqua County in western New York as manhunt focuses there. 

July 8:
A firearm found in the town of Charlotte, New York is linked to the June 10 shooting of Brown.

July 13:
State Police double the reward for helping catch Phillips to $50,000. Wounded trooper Sean Brown visits Chautauqua County to "boost morale". DA Foley says the Horton case is still under investigation, but will likely go to a grand jury. 

July 16:
A burglary near Randolph, New York is linked to Phillips. The manhunt is shifted to Cattaraugus County and a command post is established at Randolph Central School. State Police maintain their Fredonia command post. 

Late July: 
Police close their Randolph command post and largely abandon their Cattaraugus County operations.

August 8: 
A car stolen in Olean is recovered in Niagara County and linked to Phillips. Police abandon Chautauqua County.

August 9:
State Police report two confirmed sightings of Phillips and release a fresh photo of him looking into the camera from under a camouflage baseball hat. Police do not say how they obtained the photo. The photo is taken in Niagara County near the Tuscarora Indian Reservation. On this same day police pull over a vehicle believed to be carrying Phillips down Interstate 90 west bound toward the Pennsylvania border. It turned out to be a case of mistaken identity as the occupant was later identified as one Nate Shaw, an employee of the Department of Energy at West Valley.

August 19:
Phillips is spotted in Cassadaga. Police arrest three Cassadaga residents for helping him, Natasha Berg, Timothy Seekings, and Alice Kelley. Police again begin concentrating on Chautauqua County. A trooper follows a motorcycle with no inspection sticker to the apartment, and the rider is later identified as Phillips. He escaped out a rear window of the building. 

August 24:
Three more people, including former girlfriend Kasey Crowe and daughter Patrina Wright, are accused of harboring Phillips. Wright is charged with child endangerment. Her three children, including an infant, are removed from her custody. 

August 28:
State Police call Phillips a suspect in the theft of several weapons, including high-powered rifles, from a Chautauqua County gun shop over the weekend and the theft of car a few miles away.

August 30:
Pennsylvania State Police find 35 of 41 stolen guns at a residence in Ludlow, Pennsylvania, some 20 miles south of the New York border.

August 31:
Two state troopers are shot sniper-style and critically wounded outside Crowe's home in the rural town of Pomfret in Chautauqua County. They are helicoptered out by state police aviation. Todd Nelson of Ludlow is accused of harboring Phillips for 11 days. Wright's children are returned to her custody. 

September 1:
State Police say Phillips is the prime suspect in the shootings. State Police Superintendent Wayne Bennett orders another 75 troopers to help with the manhunt. The reward for his arrest jumps to $225,000. 

September 3:
Trooper Joseph Longobardo dies at Erie County Medical Center, a day after one of his legs was amputated. 

September 4:
Police from around western New York join troopers in the manhunt. Hunters are told to stay out of the woods. 

September 5:
Children returning to school in the search area hold recess and sports practice indoors while troopers continue checking cars at roadblocks.

September 6:
U.S. marshals name Phillips to their "15 Most Wanted" list.

September 7:
Phillips is added to the FBI's 10 Most Wanted Fugitives list. Nearly 400 troopers, joined by federal and local police, search for Phillips. Announced rewards for helping catch Phillips top $400,000. 

September 8:
After a stolen car is pulled over early in the morning near the Pennsylvania-New York line, near the town of Carroll, a man believed to be Phillips runs into the woods. This is televised on the national news. As many as three cars are stolen as the chase leads into Pennsylvania. Authorities evacuate a golf course near the state line in Russell, Pennsylvania, where shots are fired. Local, county, state and federal officers, some with dogs, search for Phillips. Phillips surrenders to Pennsylvania State Police about 8 p.m., walking out of a field with his hands up. 

September 9:
Phillips is charged with eight counts, including attempted aggravated murder, first-degree attempted murder and second-degree attempted murder, in Chemung County, New York in connection with the shooting of a state trooper on June 10 that intensified a five-month manhunt. There is not enough evidence to charge him with the August 31 shootings. The unlawful flight to avoid prosecution charge was waived at the request of U.S. Attorney Terrance Flynn. This clears the way for the more serious state charges. 

September 10:
State troopers recover a .308 rifle in the woods near the field where Phillips was captured.

September 19:
Daniel De Federicis, president of the Police Benevolent Association of the New York State Troopers, releases a letter claiming that the manhunt was "poorly planned, poorly organized, poorly led and poorly executed", and demands an independent investigation of the search. 

November 18: 
Phillips claims that guards at the Chemung County Jail are mistreating him due to his notoriety. In a six-page letter to The Buffalo News, he claims he is being provoked with obscenities, that the TV is left on all night so he can't sleep, he is being watched shower, and denied routine privileges. Chemung County Sheriff Christopher Moss denies the claims. Moss adds that Phillips is a model prisoner, but is under surveillance at all times because he is considered an escape risk. 

November 29: 
Phillips pleads guilty in Chemung County Court to attempted murder regarding the June shooting of Trooper Brown. He then pleaded guilty in Chautauqua County Court to the murder and attempted murder of Troopers Longobardo and Baker, respectively. 

November 30: 
Phillips pleads not guilty in Erie County court to claims he broke out of the Erie County Correctional Facility in Alden, New York.

December 19: 
Phillips is sentenced to life imprisonment in Chautauqua County Court for the murder and attempted murder of Troopers Longobardo and Baker, respectively. He is then sentenced to 25 years to life in Erie County Court on the escape charges.

April 29, 2008:
Phillips formally files his appeal.

Manhunt controversy

Police competency and actions
Some residents of western New York were initially annoyed and angered by the search for Phillips in April 2006 by Erie County Sheriff's office. There were reports that helicopters were searching wooded areas and with the Sheriff's office informing residents what they were investigating. Calls to the sheriff were met with responses that included "we can't disclose that information." From the start of the search people who lived in Chautauqua County had their lives disrupted. Helicopters would fly low over households at 2 and 3 a.m., spook livestock and wake residents. Small children were afraid to go outside, fearing the noise of the helicopters.

Police competency was questioned by local residents. There would be a sighting, and then Phillips would get away. This pattern was repeated for weeks and then months. Locals referred to cops as "keystones" and seemed to favor the idea of Phillip's being on the loose, due to his ability to escape capture, despite being seen in the area, and the hundreds of troopers brought into Chautauqua County. No figures have been officially released, but some reports state that New York State spent $8 million on the manhunt from April until August 2006. Many locals resented the police presence. New York State Police was also criticized for not involving local law enforcement agencies in the search. The police experienced "deficiencies" with the radio system and started to use their phones to communicate in the belief that Phillips was monitoring dispatches.

On June 15, 2006, the story of Phillips broke nationally. The New York Times covered the manhunt and the situation for the local residents, with an attempt at telling both sides of the story. After the shootings of August 31, some national news media expressed disbelief that residents weren't pleased with the search for the fugitive. News organizations tried to explain why Phillips repeatedly avoided capture.

Police were said to have conducted illegal searches of the homes of Phillips' family members. They were searching property of residents unrelated to Phillips without warrants or informing owners. Residents reported their wire horse fencing had been cut by police on ATV's, endangering their animals. Residents were both inconvenienced, were angry at the heavy police presence due to the proximity of an escaped convict, and some were even fearful of the police due to the shooting of Brad Horton.

Several family members—Patrina Wright, 23, Phillip's daughter, Kasey Crowe, 42, Wright's mother, and Norma Gloss, 65, Crowe's mother—were watched, followed and allegedly harassed by police. Family members started carrying video cameras so they could document the police harassment they claimed they were experiencing. Several family members pressed charges against the police, including Gloss, for a shoulder injury that resulted from being slammed against a wall by police and Wright, for being kicked in the stomach while she was eight months pregnant.

The alleged harassment of family members went on during the course of the search. New York State Troopers aided by FBI agents supposedly interrogated Wright's five-year-old son at Wheelock Primary School without Wright's knowledge or permission. Using this testimony and the testimony of an unidentified 6-year-old girl, troopers arrested Wright, Crowe and Richard Catanese, Wright's boyfriend, on charges of endangering the welfare of a child. Wright's three children, including a three-week-old nursing infant were put into protective custody and Wright was not allowed to see them for four days. Her children were returned a week later. It is believed that the shooting of troopers Baker and Longobardo were the result of Phillip's anger about his grandchildren being taken away from his daughter.

After Phillips was captured community leaders and citizens expressed their gratitude for the persistent efforts of the New York State Troopers in tracking down the fugitive. From conflicting reports on the mindset of different segments of the western New York community it is apparent that some citizens felt threatened by the large police presence in the rural part of the state while others were worried about their safety in the proximity of an escaped convict.

Following the investigation to the hunt for Phillips, New York State Troopers PBA President Daniel De Federicis released a letter to Governor George Pataki and other state officials detailing problems during the search. The thrust of the letter is that state troopers were given inadequate equipment and weapons for the search, State Police commanders engaged in turf battles over personnel from various parts of the state, and asserts the FBI pulled out of the search allegedly after State Police commanders made it known other agencies were not welcome in the search.

Shooting of Brad Horton 
On June 26, 2006, police were looking for Phillips in the town of Sheridan in Chautauqua County, due to vehicles believed to be stolen by Phillips showing up there. Trooper Sean Pierce stopped Bradley Horton, 25, on his ATV. From this point on in the story, the police and the local resident's stories differ.

The police claim that Horton sped away, dragging the officer. Friends of Horton claim that no one was dragged. The New York State Trooper shot Brad Horton. Friends of Horton claim they were kept from the area and were not allowed to find him to get medical assistance to him. Horton called his wife and 911 as he lay dying in the field. His family was also unable to search for him. Eventually, Chautauqua County Sheriff officers were let onto the scene and located Horton. He was flown by helicopter to Hamot Medical Center in Erie, Pennsylvania. Horton died that evening.

The medical examiner's report showed five gunshot wounds to the back, with no upward angle present in the entry wounds. This evidence contradicts the trooper's account of shooting Horton while being dragged by the ATV. How the trooper was allegedly dragged has not ever been explained.

Initially, the media reported this shooting as a separate incident, unrelated to the search for Phillips. However, many residents reported hearing the trooper on their police scanners say "I got him. I shot Bucky. Or I at least shot the guy who was with him." Others reported hearing troopers say that "they had 'the suspect,' and someone should notify Erie County."

Horton's family and local residents can't explain how someone who was being dragged and lay injured a mile down the road could simultaneously send a message on his radio. Police recordings of that evening's communication have disappeared. The trooper was allowed to return to work that evening since his injuries weren't serious. The trooper's name is Sean Pierce.

Angered residents pressured the Chautauqua County District Attorney to investigate the incident and seek justice for the family of Brad Horton. The shooting was investigated by the New York State Police bureau of criminal investigation and the Chautauqua County District Attorney's office. Following the investigation, on September 29, 2006, a grand jury in Chautauqua County decided not to indict Trooper Pierce in the shooting.

References

External links

US Marshals wanted poster
 The Internet Wayback Machine's archive of Phillips' FBI top ten most wanted poster
New York's Most Wanted police profile
America's Most Wanted profile
 New York Times Article 

1962 births
American escapees
American people convicted of murdering police officers
American prisoners sentenced to life imprisonment
Criminals from New York (state)
Escapees from New York (state) detention
Escapees from Pennsylvania detention
Fugitives
Living people
People convicted of murder by New York (state)
People from Chautauqua County, New York
Place of birth missing (living people)
Police brutality in the United States